Squadron Leader Laurence  Henry Forster Irving  (11 April 1897 – 23 October 1988) was an artist, book illustrator and Hollywood set designer and art director, the son of actors H. B. Irving and Dorothea Baird, and the biographer of his grandfather, the Victorian era actor Henry Irving. His sister was the actress and founder of the Keep Britain Tidy Campaign, Elizabeth Irving. He lived and died in Wittersham, Kent in 1988, within walking distance of the house, Smallhythe Place, where Dame Ellen Terry lived, who was his grandfather's leading lady at the Lyceum Theatre in London's West End.

Biography
Named after his uncle, Laurence Sydney Brodribb Irving, Laurence Irving was born in London in 1897. He briefly and unhappily attended Wellington College and later trained as a painter at the Byam Shaw School of Art and the Royal Academy School, studying under Charles Ricketts and Charles Shannon. On completion of his art training Irving specialised in landscape and marine painting before commencing on his career as a designer for the theatre. He was a pilot in the Royal Naval Air Service (RNAS) during World War I, ending the War with the rank of Captain.<ref name=auto>Irving, Laurence Designing for the Movies: the Memoirs of Laurence Irving</ref>  In 1919 he became engaged to Rosalind Frances Woolner, the granddaughter of the Pre-Raphaelite sculptor Thomas Woolner. They married in 1920.

Irving was also a book illustrator, producing artwork for Richard Hakluyt's Voyages & Discoveries of the English (1926) and John Masefield's Philip the King (1927). In 1928 Irving went to Hollywood with Douglas Fairbanks to be his Art Director on The Iron Mask (1929), the last of his full-scale silent films and, later, in collaboration with William Cameron Menzies, to design the production of the film version of The Taming of the Shrew (1929).  He was the Art Director for the films 77 Park Lane (1931) and Colonel Blood (1934). In his memoirs, Irving vividly recounts working in Hollywood for such figures as Mary Pickford and Charlie Chaplin. On his return to the United Kingdom in the 1930s, he worked on films such as Moonlight Sonata (1937) and the Gabriel Pascal films of Shaw's Pygmalion (1938) and Major Barbara (1941).Pygmalion (1938) on the Internet Movie Database

Irving was recalled to the R.A.F. in October 1939 at the start of World War II to serve in the Intelligence Department at the Air Ministry. In March 1940 he was posted to H.Q. British Air Forces in France  to be responsible for writing official communiqués and persuading accredited war correspondents to abide by the principle of censorship accepted by their editors. After the surrender of France he returned to the Air Ministry convinced that the system of local defence could have brought the German armoured thrust to a halt. A memorandum he wrote to this effect led to his posting as a Staff Officer to H.Q. 12 Corps., then sparsely equipped to repel a German invasion, to help Peter Fleming to recruit and train an underground force of saboteurs to harass the enemy if a bridgehead was established in Kent and Sussex. When South Eastern Command took control of military operations in that area it was allotted an R.A.F. reconnaissance Wing of three Squadrons and an Air Staff to promote Army/Air co-operation. As Senior Intelligence Officer of 35 Wing, Irving studied and furthered the technical and tactical resources of low level photographic and reconnaissance and the prompt distribution of intelligence derived from it. He ended the War as a Squadron Leader.

After the War he was invited by J. Arthur Rank to produce and design the film adaptation of Sheridan Le Fanu's Uncle Silas (1947). Laurence Irving wrote the highly regarded and definitive biographies Henry Irving, the Actor and his World and The Successors, and two volumes of autobiography, Designing for the Movies: the Memoirs of Laurence Irving, and Great Interruption: An Autobiography 1938-45'' (1983).

Laurence Irving was the father of John H. B. Irving and Pamela Mary Irving.

See also
Irving Family

References

External links
Irving's set designs

Designing for the Movies: The Memoirs of Laurence Irving

1897 births
1988 deaths
English illustrators
English scenic designers
English people of Cornish descent
Officers of the Order of the British Empire
British World War I pilots
Royal Air Force personnel of World War II
Alumni of the Byam Shaw School of Art
Royal Naval Air Service personnel of World War I
Royal Navy officers of World War I
Royal Air Force personnel of World War I
People from Wittersham
British emigrants to the United States